Ferris Hill is a mountain located in the Catskill Mountains of New York northeast of Roxbury. Jump Hill is located west and Negro Hill is located southeast of Ferris Hill.

References

Mountains of Delaware County, New York
Mountains of New York (state)